Vita Horobets (born 6 April 1996) is a Ukrainian basketball player for BC TIM-SKUF Kyiv and the Ukrainian national team.

She participated at the EuroBasket Women 2017.

References

1996 births
Living people
Ukrainian women's basketball players
Shooting guards
21st-century Ukrainian women